Gilchrist Porter (November 1, 1817 – November 1, 1894) was an American lawyer, jurist, and politician who served two non-consecutive terms as a U.S. Representative from Missouri from 1851 to 1853, then again from 1855 to 1857.

Early life and education 
Born in Windsor, near Fredericksburg, Virginia, Porter received a limited schooling.  He studied law, was admitted to the bar and commenced practice in Bowling Green, Missouri. He owned slaves.

Congress 
Porter was elected as a Whig to the Thirty-second Congress (March 4, 1851 – March 3, 1853).  He was an unsuccessful candidate for reelection in 1852 to the Thirty-third Congress.

Porter was elected as an Opposition Party candidate to the Thirty-fourth Congress (March 4, 1855 – March 3, 1857). He served as chairman of the Committee on Private Land Claims (Thirty-fourth Congress).  From 1866 to 1880 he was a Missouri circuit judge.

Later career and death 
He resumed the practice of law until his death, which occurred in Hannibal, Missouri on November 1, 1894.  He was interred in Riverside Cemetery.

References

1817 births
1894 deaths
Politicians from Fredericksburg, Virginia
Whig Party members of the United States House of Representatives from Missouri
Opposition Party members of the United States House of Representatives from Missouri
Missouri lawyers
American slave owners
People from Bowling Green, Missouri